Papua New Guinea created their own honours system in 2004 with the first investitures being performed by The Princess Royal in September 2005.  Papua New Guinea still recognises the Imperial Honours System.

References 

Post
Post-nominal letters
P